The oil depletion allowance in American (US) tax law is an allowance claimable by anyone with an economic interest in a mineral deposit or standing timber.   The principle is that the asset is a capital investment that is a wasting asset, and therefore depreciation can reasonably be offset (effectively as a capital loss) against income.

The oil depletion allowance has been subject of interest, because of the relationship of big oil with the US government, and because one method (percentage depletion) of claiming the allowance makes it possible to write off more than the whole capital cost of the asset.

Depletion calculation
Two methods of depletion calculations are available, detailed regulations determine which can be used, but in some circumstances the asset owner can choose.

Cost depletion
With this method the original investment is effectively amortized over the productive life of the asset, starting with the original capital investment, the annual percentage being the percentage of the reserves at the beginning of the year that are sold in the course of the year.  The amortized amount is deducted from the net income before calculating taxes.  The total amount deducted by this method cannot exceed the original value of the capital invested.

Percentage depletion
With this method, a fixed percentage of the gross income is treated as deductible.  The percentage is dependent on the nature of the resource being extracted.  It is possible under this scheme for the total deductibles (or indeed the annual deductible) to exceed the original capital investment.

Table of percentages
The following percentages are prescribed by the Internal Revenue Code, section 613(b).

For geothermal assets the rate is 15%

Limits
For independent producers or royalty owners of oil and gas, the deduction for percentage depletion is limited to the smaller of:

 The taxable mineral income from the property figured without the deduction for depletion and the deduction for domestic production activities under section 199 of the Internal Revenue Code.
 65% of the taxpayer's gross taxable income from all sources.

Amounts not deductible due to the 65% limit can be carried forward.

Impact
The allowance has been a major corporate subsidy by the American taxpayer. Over the nine decades of its existence since 1916, the American public through the oil depletion allowance has given more than $470 billion to Big Oil and the petrochemical industry as of 2014.

Proposals for repeal
Several attempts have been advanced to repeal the allowance tax loophole. U.S. Secretary of the Treasury Henry Morgenthau in 1937 declared the depletion allowance “perhaps the most glaring loophole” in the tax code. United States President Franklin D. Roosevelt decried it and other tax-evasion stratagems by business “so widespread and so amazing, both in their boldness and their ingenuity, that further action without delay seems imperative.” The U.S. Congress refused to abolish the allowance corporate subsidy.

Similarly, President Harry S. Truman unsuccessfully proposed repealing the allowance. Efforts in Congress in 1969 to reduce dramatically or to eliminate the allowance were successfully beat back by Big Oil lobbyists. A cut in the depletion allowance deduction was enacted, however, reducing the deduction from 27.5% to 23%.

Sources
This article uses text from Internal Revenue Code, Section 613(b), and Publication 535 (2013), Business Expenses  which are in the Public Domain as works of the US Federal Government

References

American legal terminology
Petroleum economics
United States tax law
Oil and gas law